= Belém Velho =

Coordinates: 30°07′S 51°10′W

Belém Velho (meaning Old Bethlehem in Portuguese) is a neighbourhood (bairro) in the city of Porto Alegre, the state capital of Rio Grande do Sul, in Brazil. It was created by Law 4876 from December 24, 1980.
